National Tertiary Route 805, or just Route 805 (or ) is a National Road Route of Costa Rica, located in the Limón province.

Description
In Limón province the route covers Matina canton (Matina, Batán districts).

The route starts and ends at Route 32, it allows access to Matina and Batán towns. In Matina it connects with Route 813.

Junction list
The entire route is in Matina district, of Limón province.

References

Highways in Costa Rica